The Forgotten Kingdom is a 2013 American-South African-Lesotho drama film written and directed by Andrew Mudge and featuring Jerry Mofokeng. It received nine nominations, and won three awards at the 10th Africa Movie Academy Awards.

Cast
Zenzo Ngqobe as Atang Mokoenya
Nozipho Nkelemba as Dineo
Jerry Mofokeng as Katleho
Lebohang Ntsane as Orphan Boy
Moshoeshoe Chabeli as Priest
Lillian Dube as Clinic Doctor
Jerry Phele as Atang's Father
Reitumetse Qobo as Nkoti

Reception
The film has an 86% rating on Rotten Tomatoes.  Leslie Felperin of The Guardian awarded the film three stars out of five.  David Clack of Time Out also awarded it three stars out of five.  Trevor Johnston of Radio Times gave the film four stars out of five.

References

External links
 
 
 

American drama films
South African drama films
Best Sound Africa Movie Academy Award winners
Best Cinematography Africa Movie Academy Award winners
Lesotho drama films
Sotho-language films
2013 drama films
2010s American films